KaMpfumo is one of Bairros in Maputo, Mozambique.

References 

Populated places in Mozambique